Joseph Skidmore (active 1930–31) was an English footballer who played as an inside left in the Football League for Darlington. He came into Darlington's team for a 1–1 draw with Gateshead on 11 October 1930 and kept his place for the next match, away to Wrexham. After a 2–0 defeat in which Darlington were outclassed by their hosts, he lost his place and was not selected again.

References

Year of birth missing
Year of death missing
Place of birth missing
Association football inside forwards
Darlington F.C. players
English Football League players
Place of death missing
English footballers